Frederick County Public Schools (FCPS) is a K5-12 public school system serving the residents of Frederick County, Maryland. The system includes several schools to serve the educational needs of the youth in Frederick and the surrounding areas of Frederick County. The district consists of sixty-seven schools as of the 2014–2015 school year. As of the 2017–2018 school year, there were 42,204 students and 5,771 employees in the district.

Staff
Frederick County Public Schools District staff members, spread throughout the district's sixty-seven schools and central office, totaled a number of 5,490 in the 2013–14 school year who were. Out of the 5,490, 2,654 of the staff members were teachers and 2,836 were classified as other staff members according to the United States Department of Education’s NCES (National Center for Education Statistics). There were 114 school counselors throughout the district. The number of teachers in the district was 2,654 which is larger than the statewide Maryland average of 2,367.77 and the 199.14 national average of teachers per district in the United States. Teachers are spread throughout grade levels PreK- Grade 12. The district had 34.6 preschool teachers and 146 kindergarten teachers. A fraction of the total number of teachers (1,421) were elementary school teachers spread throughout all elementary schools in the county. In middle and high schools, there were 1,047 teachers. There were 788 instructional aides in the district to assist in the academic setting. In the district administration side of staffing there were 144 district administrators and 108 district administrative support working in the system in an administrative capacity. In the school administrative side there were 149 school administrators working in the district which includes principals and assistant principals. About 278 members of staff were classified as school administrative support.

According to the Maryland Department of Education’s school report card, as of the 2016-17 fiscal school year there were 5,771 employees in all of FCPS. There were 2,940 teachers, 140 principals and assistant principals, 145 counselors, and 860 instructional aides. The remainder were office staff, bus drivers, food workers, custodians and central office/administration. In the district 71.4% of all teachers have an advanced degree and 24.0% have a standard degree of some kind. 3.5% of all classes in the district are without a highly qualified teacher. The teacher to student ratio is 64.7 teachers in the system per 1,000 students and 10.5 professional staff per 1,000 students 2016–17 school year.

Budget

Per the 2022 to 2023 approved operating budget, Frederick County Public Schools total budget is $822,836,251.  The funds are provided by the Frederick County, in the amount of $365.3 million; the State of Maryland in the amount of $365.7 million; the Federal Government in the amount of $71.2 million; plus addition funds (including unspent prior year funds) in the amount of $20.6 million.  

The county had expenditures or costs of $59,215,000 or $4,545 per student on average for the 2013-14 FY. Expenditure spending is spread around to Current Expenditures, Total Capital Outlay, Total Non- El-Sec Education, and to Interest on Debt owed by the county. Current expenditures cost in total $521,143,000 and of those costs most are spent on students and staff which are marked as Instructional Expenditures and totaled $327,061,000 or about 63% of the Current Expenditure total. Student and Staff support made up $58,314,000 while Administration costs made up $48,858,000 of the Current Expenditure budget. Food Services/Operations cost $86,910,000 and is a part of the Current Expenditures budget. Total Capital Outlay cost $51,559,000. From that amount, $45,421,000 was used in construction cost such as for building new schools. Total Non-El-Sec education and others cost $1,053,000. Interest on debt owed by the school district cost $71,000 in the 3093-11 FY.

Demographics
The demographics of Frederick County Public Schools student population as of the 2016–2017 school year were 41,317 students in the entire district spread throughout grades PreK – 12. On a racial breakdown of the student population, out of 41,317 students there were 25,552 Caucasian students. 2,203 Asian students in the district, 4,914 African American students, 6,383 Latino students, 207 Alaskan Native/American Indian/Pacific Islanders, and 2,038 students of two or more races in the district. On a breakdown by gender, 21,199 out of 41,317 students were male and 20,118 students were female in the district. Attendance rates in the district also varied but were mostly high with 95.6% average of elementary students, 95.4% average of middle school students, and 94.2% average of high school students attending classes on a regular basis. The county has an overall graduation rate of 92% of all its students making it through to graduation and a dropout rate of 4.7%.

Initial enrollment for the 2017- 2018 school year was up by 826 students over the prior year to 42,204 students. Eleven thousand students in the FCPS were eligible for free or reduced-price meals or about 27% of the student population. About 4,910 students were receiving Special Education support and services. The number of students that do not speak English as a primary language in the school district numbered as 2,388 students. Student demographics for FCPS in the 2017- 2018 school year show that the county is composed of a new racial breakdown of White 26,082 students, 6,541 Hispanic/Latino students, 5,022 African American students, 2,236 Asian students, American Indian/Alaskan Natives and Pacific Islanders made up 253 students. A little over two thousand students were considered of two or more races. This is a slight shift in the new numbers from previous years.

School Recognition and Awards
Seven out of the ten of Frederick County high schools have been recognized by the U.S. News & World Report High School Rankings and have been awarded silver medals. The highest-ranked school in the county is Urbana High School in Ijamsville. Urbana HS is ranked 15th in the state of Maryland and 550 in National rankings, with a 98% graduation rate and 54.3 College readiness level, and 68% of students participate in Advanced Placement classes. Urbana HS is 50% Male and 50% female and a minority enrollment rate of 32%. The second highest ranked high school in the county was Middletown High School in Middletown, which is ranked 21st in the state and 744th in the nation. Middletown has a college readiness level of 49.2 and 64% of students participate in AP programs.

Frederick County also has multiple Blue-Ribbon schools. Kemptown Elementary School in Monrovia was awarded the National Blue-Ribbon Award in 2015 in the category of Exemplary High Performing Schools. Centerville Elementary School in Frederick was awarded the National Blue-Ribbon award in 2017 also in the category of Exemplary High Performing Schools. Centerville has over 1,000 students and PARCC (Partnership for Assessment of Readiness for College and Careers) testing proficiency scores of 82.4% in math and 77% in language arts. The state of Maryland also has awarded Frederick county schools in sustainability initiatives. Four Frederick County public schools are certified as Maryland Green Schools as administered by the Maryland Association for Environmental and Outdoor Education. Frederick County Public Schools was also the 1st Maryland school district to adapt a goal to increase tree canopy on all properties from 12% to 20% over the next thirty years.

DOJ investigation

On Wednesday, December 1, 2021 The Department Of Justice released a document detailing the seclusion tactics utilized by teachers and staff in FCPS. These seclusion techniques involved placing a student in a room for twenty-nine minutes at a time, taking them out then placing them right back in seclusion for another twenty-nine minutes. This could be repeated twelve times or more. Throughout the two and a half years FCPS was investigated, thousands of seclusion incidents were recorded. 99% of the students affected were classified as having disabilities.

After the release of the DOJ document, many parents spoke out about the mistreatment of their children. The superintendent at the time, Dr. Terry Alban, was placed on administrative leave, and after public pressure, retired. Eventually, FCPS and the DOJ reached a settlement. This settlement included hiring behavioral analysts and providing trauma therapy to students affected. The total cost is predicted to exceed four million dollars.

On July 1, 2022, a new law preventing seclusion in schools took effect in the State of Maryland. This law, springing up in the aftermath of this investigation, makes it completely illegal to seclude students in public schools. While seclusion will still be legal in private schools, It will be subject to a great deal of scrutiny.

High schools
 Brunswick High School
 Catoctin High School
 Frederick County MD Virtual High School
 Frederick High School
 Governor Thomas Johnson High School
 Linganore High School
 Middletown High School
 Oakdale High School
 Tuscarora High School
 Urbana High School
 Walkersville High School

Middle schools
 Ballenger Creek Middle, Frederick
 Brunswick Middle, Brunswick
 Crestwood Middle, Frederick
 Governor Thomas Johnson Middle, Frederick
 Middletown Middle, Middletown
 Monocacy Middle, Frederick
 New Market Middle, New Market
 Thurmont Middle, Thurmont
 Oakdale Middle, Ijamsville
 Urbana Middle, Ijamsville
 Walkersville Middle, Walkersville
 West Frederick Middle, Frederick
 Windsor Knolls Middle, Ijamsville

Elementary schools
 Ballenger Creek Elementary, Frederick
 Blue Heron Elementary, Frederick
 Brunswick Elementary, Brunswick
 Butterfly Ridge Elementary, Frederick
 Carroll Manor Elementary, Adamstown
 Centerville Elementary, Urbana 
 Deer Crossing Elementary, New Market
 Emmitsburg Elementary, Emmitsburg
 Glade Elementary, Walkersville
 Green Valley Elementary, Monrovia
 Hillcrest Elementary, Frederick
 Kemptown Elementary, Monrovia
 Lewistown Elementary, Thurmont
 Liberty Elementary, Frederick
 Lincoln Elementary, Frederick
 Middletown Elementary, Middletown
 Middletown Primary, Middletown
 Monocacy Elementary, Frederick
 Monocacy Valley, Frederick
 Myersville Elementary, Myersville
 New Market Elementary, New Market
 New Midway Elementary, Keymar
 North Frederick Elementary, Frederick
 Oakdale Elementary, Ijamsville 
 Orchard Grove Elementary, Frederick
 Parkway Elementary, Frederick
 Spring Ridge Elementary, Frederick
 Sugarloaf Elementary, Frederick
 Thurmont Elementary, Thurmont
 Thurmont Primary, Thurmont
 Tuscarora Elementary, Frederick
 Twin Ridge Elementary, Mt. Airy
 Urbana Elementary, Frederick 
 Valley Elementary, Jefferson 
 Walkersville Elementary, Walkersville 
 Waverley Elementary, Frederick
 Woodsboro Elementary, Woodsboro 
 Whittier Elementary, Frederick
 Wolfsville Elementary, Myersville 
 Yellow Springs Elementary, Frederick

Other schools
 Monocacy Valley Montessori Public Charter School, Frederick
 Career & Technology Center, Frederick
 Carroll Creek Montessori Public Charter School, Frederick
 Sabillasville Environmental School (Public Charter),  Sabillasville, MD

References

External links

School districts in Maryland
 
School districts established in 1889